Arena of Death is a 1953 Austrian-German crime film directed by Kurt Meisel and starring Richard Häussler, Katharina Mayberg, and Friedl Hardt.

The film's sets were designed by the art directors Gustav Abel and Nino Borghi.

Cast

References

Bibliography

External links 
 

1953 films
1950s crime thriller films
Austrian crime thriller films
German crime thriller films
1950s German-language films
Films directed by Kurt Meisel
Circus films
Motorcycling films
Films about stunt performers
West German films
Austrian black-and-white films
German black-and-white films
1950s German films